Moon in Scorpio is an album by the American band the Family Stand, released in 1991. The album was a commercial disappointment, with the band receiving more attention for its contributions to Paula Abdul's Spellbound.

Production
The album was produced by the Family Stand. Vernon Reid contributed some guitar parts. "Plantation Radio" is about the needless segregation found in radio programming playlists.

Critical reception

Billboard declared that Sandra St. Victor "has the sassiness of Tina Turner and the range of Chaka Khan." The New York Times called Moon in Scorpio a "full-bodied meltdown of soul, hip-hop and corrosive psychedelia," writing that "the Family Stand is fighting for musical and polemic freedom in a pop world where black artists are supposed to submit to cosmetic surgeons and let their whizbang producers do the talking." The Washington Post considered it "a potent hard-rock-and-funk concoction that rings with blood-sweat-and-tears intensity."

AllMusic wrote that the album's "meaty blend of R&B and rock was a creative triumph," and called it "an underexposed gem that's well worth searching for." The Rolling Stone Album Guide deemed it "a tripped out explosion of talent."

Track listing

Personnel
Peter Lord - keyboards, vocals
V. Jeffrey Smith - multiple instruments
Sandra St. Victor - vocals

References

1991 albums
East West Records albums